Nicholas Pocock (2 March 1740 – 9 March 1821) was an English artist known for his many detailed paintings of naval battles during the age of sail.

Birth and early career at sea
Pocock was born in Bristol in 1740, the son of a seaman. He followed his father's profession and was master of a merchant ship by the age of 26.  During his time at sea, he became a skilled artist by making ink and wash sketches of ships and coastal scenes for his log books.

Painting career
In 1778, Pocock's employer, Richard Champion, became financially insolvent due to the effects of the American Revolutionary War on transatlantic trade.  As a result, Pocock gave up the sea and devoted himself to painting.  The first of his works were exhibited by the Royal Academy in 1782.

Later that year, Pocock was commissioned to produce a series of paintings illustrating George Rodney's victory at the Battle of the Saintes. In 1789, he moved to London, where his reputation and contacts continued to grow.   He was a favourite of Samuel Hood and was appointed Marine Painter to King George.

Pocock's naval paintings incorporated extensive research, including interviewing eyewitnesses about weather and wind conditions as well as the positions, condition, and appearance of their ships; and drawing detailed plans of the battle and preliminary sketches of individual ships.  He was also present himself at the Glorious First of June in 1794, on board the frigate HMS Pegasus.

In addition to his large-scale oil paintings depicting naval battles, Pocock also produced many watercolours of coastal and ship scenes.

Family
Pocock married Ann Evans of Bristol in 1780; together they had eight children.  His son Isaac was an artist and dramatist, his second son William Innes Pocock was a Royal Navy Officer and marine artist. Two of his grandsons, Alfred Downing Fripp and George Arthur Fripp, were also artists.

Death

 
He died on 9 March 1821 at the home of his oldest son, Isaac, in Raymead in the parish of Cookham, near Maidenhead, and is buried in the parish church there.

References

Notes

Bibliography

Further reading

External links

 Pocock biography
Another Pocock biography
 Pocock paintings at the National Maritime Museum

1740 births
1821 deaths
18th-century English painters
English male painters
19th-century English painters
Artists from Bristol
People from Maidenhead
18th-century war artists
British marine artists
19th-century war artists
British war artists
19th-century English male artists
18th-century English male artists